Armen Razmiki Darbinyan (born January 23, 1964) is an Armenian politician who served as Prime Minister of Armenia from 1998 to 1999. In 1994, he was appointed First Vice-Chairman of the Central Bank of Armenia. In 1997, Darbinyan was appointed Armenian Minister of Finance. On April 10, 1998, he was appointed as the Prime Minister of Armenia until June 11, 1999. Since 2001, Armen Darbinyan has been rector of Russian-Armenian State University.

Darbinyan was recognised as a "Young World Leader" by the World Economic Forum.

Education 
In 1986, he received an honors degree at the Department of Economy, Moscow State University. In 1989, Darbinyan completed a post-graduate course at Moscow State University.

References 

1964 births
People from Gyumri
Living people
Finance ministers of Armenia
Prime Ministers of Armenia
Government ministers of Armenia